Interlude is a jazz trio album recorded by pianist Toshiko Akiyoshi in San Francisco in 1987.  It was released on the Concord Jazz record label.

Track listing
LP side A
"Interlude" (Akiyoshi) – 4:37
"I Know Who Loves You" (Akiyoshi) – 4:54
"Blue and Sentimental" (Basie, Livingston, David) – 4:49
"I Ain't Gonna Ask No More" (Akiyoshi) – 5:35
LP side B
"Pagliacci" (Puccini) – 4:43
"Solitude" (Ellington, DeLange, Mills) – 5:34
"So in Love" (Porter) – 4:41
"You Stepped Out of a Dream" (Kahn, Brown) – 4:13

Personnel
Toshiko Akiyoshi – piano
Dennis Irwin – bass
Eddie Marshall – drums

References / External Links
Concord Jazz CCD-4324 
[ Allmusic]

Concord Records albums
Toshiko Akiyoshi albums
1987 albums